The riyal (Arabic: ريال ) was the currency of the Kingdom of Hejaz between 1916 and 1925. It was subdivided into 20 qirsh. The riyal was a silver coin the same weight as the Ottoman 20 kuruş coin but was minted in 1917 fineness rather than 1830 fineness. The Hejaz riyal was replaced by the Saudi riyal in 1925 at par.

Coins
In 1916, bronze coins were issued for ⅛, ¼, ½ and 1 qirsh together with silver 5, 10 and 20 qirsh. Gold 1 dinar coins were also minted.

References

 

Modern obsolete currencies
Currencies of Asia
1916 establishments in Hejaz
1925 disestablishments
Kingdom of Hejaz
Currencies of Saudi Arabia